Zamzerj (also Romanized as Zamzarj; also known as Zamzerch) is a village in Balvard Rural District, in the Central District of Sirjan County, Kerman Province, Iran. At the 2006 census, its population was 102, in 27 families.

References 

Populated places in Sirjan County